Glide On is an album by guitarist Bill Jennings with organist Jack McDuff recorded in 1960 and released on the Prestige label.

Reception

AllMusic's Richie Unterberger stated "This is a pretty mellow set of bluesy jazz ... Jennings is more of a tasteful player than a fiery one, but he does crank up the heat for some rapid-fire single-note lines". On All About Jazz, Derek Taylor said "Jennings’ maybe be a forgotten footnote today, but after listening to this disc it’s easy to imagine that he had his moment in the limelight shortly after these sessions hit the record shops".

Track listing 
 "Glide On" (Jack Wilson) – 5:32
 "Alexandria, VA." (Bill Jennings, Sonny Clayton) – 3:52
 "Billin' and Bluin'" (Bill Jennings, Al Jennings) – 4:42
 "There'll Never Be Another You" (Harry Warren, Mack Gordon) – 3:50
 "Azure-Te (Paris Blues)"  (Bill Davis, Don Wolf) – 4:40
 "Fiddlin'"  (Bill Jennings, Al Jennings) – 2:34
 "Cole Slaw" (Jesse Stone) – 8:07
 "Hey Mrs. Jones" (Robert L. Ragan, Marion Miller) – 4:21

Personnel 
Bill Jennings – guitar
Jack McDuff – organ, piano
Al Jennings – vibraphone, guitar
Wendell Marshall – bass
Alvin Johnson – drums

References 

Bill Jennings (guitarist) albums
Jack McDuff albums
1960 albums
Prestige Records albums
Albums recorded at Van Gelder Studio
Albums produced by Esmond Edwards